A referendum concerning the creation of a new state of New England from the northern area of New South Wales was put to voters on 29 April 1967.

Background

The question
Are you in favour of the establishment of a new state in north-east New South Wales as described in Schedule One to the New State Referendum Act, 1966?

The area included by the proposed new state comprised the

Results
The referendum rejected the proposed new state.

See also 
 Referendums in New South Wales
 Referendums in Australia

References

1928 referendums
Referendums in New South Wales
September 1928 events
1920s in New South Wales
Alcohol law
Alcohol in Australia